The Amotape complex is an archaeological culture on the northern coast of Peru dated to between c. 9,000 and 7,100  BCE. It constitutes some of the oldest evidence for human occupation of the Peruvian coast. The Amotape complex was identified by the American anthropologist James Richardson III, who located a dozen small camps in the Peruvian coastal desert at the foot of the Amotape hills, near the modern city of Talara. The people of the Amotope complex were hunter–gatherers who manufactured unifacial stone tools in chalcedony and quartzite to exploit a variety of local plants and animals. They also collected shellfish in the mangrove swamps which covered the coastline at that time.

The contemporary developments at Huaca Prieta and Siches area (north Peru, close to Ecuador) also share similar features.

See also
 Lauricocha culture
 Paiján culture

Notes

References

 Dillehay, Tom. The Settlement of the Americas: a new prehistory. New York: Basic Books, 2000.
 Dillehay, Tom, Duccio Bonavia and Peter Kaulicke. "The first settlers". In Helaine Silverman (ed.), Andean archaeology. Malden, MA: Blackwell, 2004, pp. 16–34.
 Lavallée, Danièle. The first South Americans: the peopling of a continent from the earliest evidence to high culture. Salt Lake City: University of Utah Press, 2000.
 Moseley, Michael. The Incas and their ancestors: the archaeology of Peru. London: Thames and Hudson, 2004.

History of Peru
Pre-Columbian cultures
Andean preceramic